Listen to the Voices of the Sea is a 1950 Japanese anti-war film directed by Hideo Sekigawa. It is based on the 1949 best-selling book Listen to the Voices from the Sea, a collection of letters by Japanese student soldiers killed in World War II. The first post-war Japanese film to feature battle scenes, it was also a big success with domestic cinema audiences.

Plot
Burma during the last weeks of World War II: The remnants of a Japanese infantry unit are joined by Private Oki, whose own unit has been destroyed. Oki turns out to be the former University professor of some of the soldiers, many of which are drafted students. He is bullied by the sadistic adjutant of the commanding Lieutenant Kishino, himself an uneducated man who dislikes students and academics. Close to the edge of starvation, a group of soldiers, led by squad leader Aoji, steal and slaughter the Lieutenant's horse. Upon discovery, Aoji is beaten, while the adjutant uses the incident as a pretence to execute Private Kawanishi who overtly opposes the war. When the soldiers are sent out to battle against an outnumbering enemy, the wounded are left behind to commit suicide with hand grenades. The rest of the unit is killed in artillery fire, only Kishino and his adjutant, as the film suggests, manage to escape. The last scene shows the soldiers' souls emerging from their scattered corpses.

Cast

Literary background
In the flashback sequence showing the last university lecture because of the students' mobilisation, Professor Oki cites extensively from French philosopher and humanist Montaigne's 1580 essay  (How the soul discharges its passions on false objects, when the true ones fail it), describing it as a contemplation on death in times marked by wars. He closes with a quote from Montaigne's essay  (That to philosophise is to learn to die).

Home media
Listen to the Voices of the Sea was released on DVD in Japan in 2005 and in the Czech Republic in 2009.

References

External links
 
 
 

1950 films
1950s Japanese-language films
Japanese black-and-white films
Japanese war drama films
Toei Company films
Films scored by Akira Ifukube
1950s war drama films
1950 drama films
Anti-war films
Japanese World War II films
1950s Japanese films